Furtado is a surname of [Spanish language] origin common in Portugal and Brazil. It may refer to: 

Caetano Xavier Furtado (1897–1980), Goan born botanist
Celso Furtado (1920–2004), influential Brazilian economist
Franklim Furtado (born 1987), Bissau-Guinean basketball player
Jorge Furtado (born 1959), Brazilian film writer and director
José Emilio Furtado (born 1983), Cape Verdean footballer
Juli Furtado (born 1967), US mountain biker
Nelly Furtado (born 1978), Canadian singer-songwriter
Nicolás Furtado (born 1988), Uruguayan actor
Tony Furtado (born 1967), US Folk/Americana banjoist, slide guitarist singer/songwriter
Francisco Xavier de Mendonça Furtado (1701–1769), Portuguese soldier and Secretary of State, Governor of Brazil

See also
Hurtado

Portuguese-language surnames